Xysticus is a genus of ground crab spiders described by C. L. Koch in 1835, belonging to the order Araneae, family Thomisidae. The genus name is derived from the Ancient Greek root xyst, meaning "scraped, scraper".

Description
Xysticus and Coriarachne are dark brown or reddish-brown crab spiders often encountered on weeds or trees. While similar to the 'flower spiders', they tend to have shorter, sturdier legs. Many, but not all, species have abdomens more patterned than most Thomisus species, rather like some of the Synema species. Some however, that are more terrestrial, resemble earth in colour and texture.

Most species of the genus Xysticus are small to medium sized spiders. They show a sexual dimorphism in size.

The basic colour of these species is usually brown, beige or gray. The prosoma is sometimes slightly smaller than the opisthosoma. In many species the front body shows in the middle a broad, pale longitudinal band. The opisthosoma is clearly flattened in most species and shows a median broad and dark leaf marking.

The species are often very similar to each other, and in most cases can be distinguished only by a microscopic examination of the reproductive organs.

Behaviour
The spiders of the genus Xysticus do not build webs; like most Thomisidae they are ambush hunters and prefer to hunt near the ground (hence the common name "ground crab spiders"). They move slowly, and commonly hunt by stationing themselves in a high-traffic area and grabbing whatever arthropod passes close enough. Also like most other Thomisidae, they seize prey with their enlarged anterior two pairs of legs and kill it by a venomous bite.

Species
 it contains 293 species, found worldwide:

 Xysticus abditus Logunov, 2006 — Bulgaria, Turkey
 Xysticus acerbus Thorell, 1872 — Europe to Central Asia
 Xysticus acerbus obscurior Kulczyński, 1895 — Ukraine
 Xysticus acquiescens Emerton, 1919 — Holarctic
 Xysticus advectus O. P.-Cambridge, 1890 — Guatemala, Costa Rica
 Xysticus aethiopicus L. Koch, 1875 — Ethiopia
 Xysticus albertensis Dondale, 2008 — Canada
 Xysticus albolimbatus Hu, 2001 — China
 Xysticus alboniger Turnbull, Dondale & Redner, 1965 — USA, Canada
 Xysticus aletaiensis Hu & Wu, 1989 — China
 Xysticus alpicola Kulczyński, 1882 — Czech Republic, Slovakia, Poland, Ukraine
 Xysticus alpinistus Ono, 1978 — Nepal, China
 Xysticus alpinus Kulczyński, 1887 — Alps (Switzerland, Italy, Germany, Austria)
 Xysticus alsus Song & Wang, 1994 — China
 Xysticus altaicus Simon, 1895 — Kazakhstan
 Xysticus altitudinis Levy, 1976 — Israel
 Xysticus ampullatus Turnbull, Dondale & Redner, 1965 — USA, Canada
 Xysticus apachecus Gertsch, 1933 — USA
 Xysticus apalacheus Gertsch, 1953 — USA
 Xysticus apertus Banks, 1898 — Mexico
 Xysticus apricus L. Koch, 1876 — Italy
 Xysticus aprilinus Bryant, 1930 — USA
 Xysticus arenarius Thorell, 1875 — Ukraine
 Xysticus arenicola Simon, 1875 — France
 Xysticus argenteus Jézéquel, 1966 — Ivory Coast
 Xysticus asper (Lucas, 1838) — Canary Islands
 Xysticus atevs Ovtsharenko, 1979 — Russia
 Xysticus atrimaculatus Bösenberg & Strand, 1906 — China, Korea, Japan
 Xysticus auctificus Keyserling, 1880 — USA, Canada
 Xysticus audax (Schrank, 1803) — Palearctic
 Xysticus audax massanicus Simon, 1932 — France
 Xysticus audaxoides Zhang, Zhang & Song, 2004 — China
 Xysticus austrosibiricus Logunov & Marusik, 1998 — Russia, Mongolia, China
 Xysticus autumnalis L. Koch, 1875 — New South Wales
 Xysticus aztecus Gertsch, 1953 — Mexico
 Xysticus bacurianensis Mcheidze, 1971 — Turkey, Russia, Georgia, Azerbaijan
 Xysticus bakanas Marusik & Logunov, 1990 — Kazakhstan
 Xysticus banksi Bryant, 1933 — USA
 Xysticus barbatus Caporiacco, 1936 — Libya
 Xysticus benefactor Keyserling, 1880 — USA, Canada
 Xysticus bengalensis Tikader & Biswas, 1974 — India
 Xysticus bengdakus Saha & Raychaudhuri, 2007 — India
 Xysticus beni Strand, 1913 — Central Africa
 Xysticus berlandi Schenkel, 1963 — China
 Xysticus bermani Marusik, 1994 — Russia, China
 Xysticus bharatae Gajbe & Gajbe, 1999 — India
 Xysticus bicolor L. Koch, 1867 — Greece
 Xysticus bicuspis Keyserling, 1887 — USA
 Xysticus bifasciatus C. L. Koch, 1837 — Palearctic
 Xysticus bimaculatus L. Koch, 1867 — Queensland
 Xysticus bohdanowiczi Zhang, Zhu & Song, 2004 — China
 Xysticus bolivari Gertsch, 1953 — Mexico
 Xysticus bradti Gertsch, 1953 — Mexico
 Xysticus breviceps O. P.-Cambridge, 1885 — India
 Xysticus brevidentatus Wunderlich, 1995 — Italy, Croatia, Bosnia and Herzegoniva, Montenegro, Albania
 Xysticus britcheri Gertsch, 1934 — Russia, Alaska, Canada, USA
 Xysticus brunneitibiis Caporiacco, 1939 — Ethiopia
 Xysticus californicus Keyserling, 1880 — USA, Mexico
 Xysticus canadensis Gertsch, 1934 — Russia, USA, Canada
 Xysticus caspicus Utochkin, 1968 — Russia, Turkmenistan, Kazakhstan
 Xysticus caucasius L. Koch, 1878 — Georgia
 Xysticus chaparralis Schick, 1965 — USA
 Xysticus charitonowi Mcheidze, 1971 — Georgia
 Xysticus chippewa Gertsch, 1953 — Holarctic
 Xysticus chui Ono, 1992 — Taiwan
 Xysticus clercki (Audouin, 1826) — Egypt, Ethiopia
 Xysticus cochise Gertsch, 1953 — USA
 Xysticus coloradensis Bryant, 1930 — USA
 Xysticus concinnus Kroneberg, 1875 — Central Asia
 Xysticus concretus Utochkin, 1968 — Russia, China, Korea, Japan
 Xysticus concursus Gertsch, 1934 — USA
 Xysticus conflatus Song, Tang & Zhu, 1995 — China
 Xysticus connectens Kulczyński, 1901 — China
 Xysticus cor Canestrini, 1873 — Southern Europe, Turkey, Azores, Iran
 Xysticus corsicus Simon, 1875 — Corsica
 Xysticus crispabilis Song & Gao, 1996 — China
 Xysticus cristatus (Clerck, 1757) — Palearctic, Introduced to Canada, USA
 Xysticus croceus Fox, 1937 — India, Nepal, Bhutan, China, Vietnam, Korea, Taiwan, Japan
 Xysticus cunctator Thorell, 1877 — USA, Canada
 Xysticus curtus Banks, 1898 — Mexico
 Xysticus dali Li & Yang, 2008 — China
 Xysticus davidi Schenkel, 1963 — Russia, China
 Xysticus denisi Schenkel, 1963 — China
 Xysticus desidiosus Simon, 1875 — Europe
 Xysticus discursans Keyserling, 1880 — North America
 Xysticus diversus (Blackwall, 1870) — Sicily
 Xysticus doriai (Dalmas, 1922) — Italy
 Xysticus dzhungaricus Tyschchenko, 1965 — Russia, Central Asia to China
 Xysticus edax (O. P.-Cambridge, 1872) — Turkey, Israel
 Xysticus elegans Keyserling, 1880 — USA, Canada, Alaska
 Xysticus elephantus Ono, 1978 — Nepal, China
 Xysticus ellipticus Turnbull, Dondale & Redner, 1965 — USA, Canada
 Xysticus emertoni Keyserling, 1880 — USA, Canada, Alaska, Slovakia to China
 Xysticus ephippiatus Simon, 1880 — Kazakhstan, Russia, Central Asia, Mongolia, China, Korea, Japan
 Xysticus erraticus (Blackwall, 1834) — Europe, Russia
 Xysticus facetus O. P.-Cambridge, 1896 — Mexico to El Salvador
 Xysticus fagei Lessert, 1919 — East Africa
 Xysticus federalis Gertsch, 1953 — Mexico
 Xysticus ferox (Hentz, 1847) — USA, Canada
 Xysticus ferrugineus Menge, 1876 — Palearctic
 Xysticus ferruginoides Schenkel, 1963 — Russia, Mongolia
 Xysticus fervidus Gertsch, 1953 — USA, Canada
 Xysticus flavitarsis Simon, 1877 — Congo
 Xysticus flavovittatus Keyserling, 1880 — USA
 Xysticus floridanus Banks, 1896 — USA
 Xysticus fraternus Banks, 1895 — USA, Canada
 Xysticus funestus Keyserling, 1880 — North America
 Xysticus furtivus Gertsch, 1936 — USA
 Xysticus gallicus Simon, 1875 — Palearctic
 Xysticus gallicus batumiensis Mcheidze & Utochkin, 1971 — Georgia
 Xysticus gattefossei Denis, 1956 — Morocco
 Xysticus geometres L. Koch, 1874 — Queensland
 Xysticus gertschi Schick, 1965 — North America
 Xysticus ghigii Caporiacco, 1938 — Mexico
 Xysticus gortanii Caporiacco, 1922 — Italy
 Xysticus gosiutus Gertsch, 1933 — USA, Canada
 Xysticus gracilis Keyserling, 1880 — Colombia
 Xysticus grallator Simon, 1932 — Portugal, Spain, France (Corsica), Italy (Sardinia)
 Xysticus guizhou Song & Zhu, 1997 — China
 Xysticus gulosus Keyserling, 1880 — North America
 Xysticus havilandi Lawrence, 1942 — South Africa
 Xysticus hedini Schenkel, 1936 — Russia, Mongolia, China, Korea, Japan
 Xysticus helophilus Simon, 1890 — Yemen
 Xysticus hepaticus Simon, 1903 — Madagascar
 Xysticus himalayaensis Tikader & Biswas, 1974 — India
 Xysticus hindusthanicus Basu, 1965 — India
 Xysticus hui Platnick, 1993 — China
 Xysticus humilis Redner & Dondale, 1965 — USA
 Xysticus ibex Simon, 1875 — France, Spain
 Xysticus ibex dalmasi Simon, 1932 — France
 Xysticus ictericus L. Koch, 1874 — Fiji
 Xysticus idolothytus Logunov, 1995 — Kazakhstan, Mongolia
 Xysticus illaudatus Logunov, 1995 — Russia
 Xysticus imitarius Gertsch, 1953 — USA
 Xysticus indiligens (Walckenaer, 1837) — USA
 Xysticus insulicola Bösenberg & Strand, 1906 — China, Korea, Japan
 Xysticus iviei Schick, 1965 — USA
 Xysticus iviei sierrensis Schick, 1965 — USA
 Xysticus jabalpurensis Gajbe & Gajbe, 1999 — India
 Xysticus jaharai Basu, 1979 — India
 Xysticus japenus Roewer, 1938 — Indonesia
 Xysticus jiangi Peng, Yin & Kim, 2000 — China
 Xysticus jinlin Song & Zhu, 1995 — China
 Xysticus joyantius Tikader, 1966 — India
 Xysticus jugalis L. Koch, 1875 — Ethiopia
 Xysticus jugalis larvatus Caporiacco, 1949 — Kenya
 Xysticus kalandadzei Mcheidze & Utochkin, 1971 — Georgia
 Xysticus kali Tikader & Biswas, 1974 — India
 Xysticus kamakhyai Tikader, 1962 — India
 Xysticus kansuensis Tang, Song & Zhu, 1995 — China, Japan
 Xysticus kashidi Tikader, 1963 — India
 Xysticus kaznakovi Utochkin, 1968 — Greece to Central Asia
 Xysticus kempeleni Thorell, 1872 — Europe to Central Asia
 Xysticus kempeleni nigriceps Simon, 1932 — France
 Xysticus khasiensis Tikader, 1980 — India
 Xysticus kochi Thorell, 1872 — Europe, Mediterranean to Central Asia
 Xysticus kochi abchasicus Mcheidze & Utochkin, 1971 — Georgia
 Xysticus kulczynskii Wierzbicki, 1902 — Azerbaijan, Iran
 Xysticus kurilensis Strand, 1907 — Russia, China, Korea, Japan
 Xysticus kuzgi Marusik & Logunov, 1990 — Central Asia
 Xysticus laetus Thorell, 1875 — Italy to Central Asia
 Xysticus lanio C. L. Koch, 1835 — Palearctic
 Xysticus lanio alpinus Kulczyński, 1887 — Austria
 Xysticus lapidarius Utochkin, 1968 — Central Asia
 Xysticus lassanus Chamberlin, 1925 — USA, Mexico
 Xysticus latitabundus Logunov, 1995 — Russia
 Xysticus lendli Kulczyński, 1897 — Hungary
 Xysticus lepnevae Utochkin, 1968 — Russia, Korea, Sakhalin
 Xysticus lineatus (Westring, 1851) — Palearctic
 Xysticus locuples Keyserling, 1880 — North America
 Xysticus logunovi Seyfulina & Mikhailov, 2004 — Russia
 Xysticus logunovorum Blick & Ono, 2021 — Iran
 Xysticus lucifugus Lawrence, 1937 — South Africa
 Xysticus luctans (C. L. Koch, 1845) — USA, Canada
 Xysticus luctator L. Koch, 1870 — Palearctic
 Xysticus luctuosus (Blackwall, 1836) — Holarctic
 Xysticus lutzi Gertsch, 1935 — USA, Mexico
 Xysticus macedonicus Silhavy, 1944 — Germany, Switzerland, Austria, Italy, Albania, North Macedonia, Greece, Turkey
 Xysticus maculatipes Roewer, 1962 — Afghanistan
 Xysticus maculiger Roewer, 1951 — Yarkand
 Xysticus manas Song & Zhu, 1995 — China
 Xysticus marmoratus Thorell, 1875 — Hungary, Slovakia, Bulgaria, Russia, Ukraine
 Xysticus martensi Ono, 1978 — Nepal
 Xysticus marusiki Ono & Martens, 2005 — Turkey, Iran
 Xysticus metinaktasi Demir, Seyyar & Türker, 2017 — Turkey
 Xysticus montanensis Keyserling, 1887 — USA, Canada, Alaska
 Xysticus mugur Marusik, 1990 — Russia
 Xysticus mulleri Lawrence, 1952 — South Africa
 Xysticus multiaculeatus Caporiacco, 1940 — Ethiopia
 Xysticus mundulus O. P.-Cambridge, 1885 — Yarkand
 Xysticus namaquensis Simon, 1910 — South Africa
 Xysticus natalensis Lawrence, 1938 — South Africa
 Xysticus nataliae Utochkin, 1968 — Russia
 Xysticus nigriceps Berland, 1922 — East Africa
 Xysticus nigropunctatus L. Koch, 1867 — Queensland
 Xysticus nigrotrivittatus (Simon, 1870) — Portugal, Spain
 Xysticus nitidus Hu, 2001 — China
 Xysticus nubilus Simon, 1875 — Macaronesia, Mediterranean, Georgia
 Xysticus nyingchiensis Song & Zhu, 1995 — China
 Xysticus obscurus Collett, 1877 — Holarctic
 Xysticus ocala Gertsch, 1953 — USA
 Xysticus orizaba Banks, 1898 — Mexico
 Xysticus ovatus Simon, 1876 — France
 Xysticus paiutus Gertsch, 1933 — USA, Mexico
 Xysticus palawanicus Barrion & Litsinger, 1995 — Philippines
 Xysticus palpimirabilis Marusik & Chevrizov, 1990 — Kyrgyzstan
 Xysticus parallelus Simon, 1873 — Corsica, Sardinia
 Xysticus parapunctatus Song & Zhu, 1995 — China
 Xysticus pearcei Schick, 1965 — USA, Mexico
 Xysticus peccans O. P.-Cambridge, 1876 — Egypt
 Xysticus pellax O. P.-Cambridge, 1894 — North America
 Xysticus peltiformus Zhang, Zhu & Song, 2004 — China
 Xysticus peninsulanus Gertsch, 1934 — USA
 Xysticus periscelis Simon, 1908 — Western Australia
 Xysticus pieperi Ono & Martens, 2005 — Iran
 Xysticus pigrides Mello-Leitao, 1929 — Cape Verde Islands
 Xysticus pingshan Zhang, Zhu & Song, 2004 — China
 Xysticus posti Sauer, 1968 — USA
 Xysticus pretiosus Gertsch, 1934 — USA, Canada
 Xysticus promiscuus O. P.-Cambridge, 1876 — Egypt, Israel
 Xysticus pseudobliteus (Simon, 1880) — Russia, Kazakhstan, Mongolia, China, Korea
 Xysticus pseudocristatus Azarkina & Logunov, 2001 — Pakistan, Central Asia to China
 Xysticus pseudolanio Wunderlich, 1995 — Bulgaria, Turkey, Georgia
 Xysticus pseudoluctuosus Marusik & Logunov, 1995 — Turkey, Tajikistan
 Xysticus pulcherrimus Keyserling, 1880 — Colombia
 Xysticus punctatus Keyserling, 1880 — USA, Canada
 Xysticus pygmaeus Tyschchenko, 1965 — Kazakhstan
 Xysticus pynurus Tikader, 1968 — India
 Xysticus quadrispinus Caporiacco, 1933 — Libya
 Xysticus quadrispinus concolor Caporiacco, 1933 — Libya
 Xysticus quagga Jocque, 1977 — Morocco
 Xysticus rainbowi Strand, 1901 — New Guinea
 Xysticus robinsoni Gertsch, 1953 — USA, Mexico
 Xysticus rockefelleri Gertsch, 1953 — Mexico
 Xysticus roonwali Tikader, 1964 — India, Nepal
 Xysticus rostratus Ono, 1988 — Russia, Japan
 Xysticus ryukyuensis Ono, 2002 — Ryukyu Islands
 Xysticus saganus Bösenberg & Strand, 1906 — Russia, China, Korea, Japan
 Xysticus sagittifer Lawrence, 1927 — Namibia
 Xysticus sansan Levy, 2007 — Israel
 Xysticus schoutedeni Lessert, 1943 — Congo
 Xysticus semicarinatus Simon, 1932 — France, Spain, Portugal
 Xysticus sharlaa Marusik & Logunov, 2002 — Russia, China
 Xysticus shillongensis Tikader, 1962 — India
 Xysticus shyamrupus Tikader, 1966 — India
 Xysticus siciliensis Wunderlich, 1995 — Sicily
 Xysticus sicus Fox, 1937 — Russia, China, Korea
 Xysticus sikkimus Tikader, 1970 — India, China
 Xysticus silvestrii Simon, 1905 — Argentina
 Xysticus simonstownensis Strand, 1909 — South Africa
 Xysticus sjostedti Schenkel, 1936 — Russia, Kazakhstan, Mongolia, China
 Xysticus slovacus Svaton, Pekar & Prídavka, 2000 — Slovakia, Russia
 Xysticus soderbomi Schenkel, 1936 — Mongolia, China
 Xysticus soldatovi Utochkin, 1968 — Russia, China
 Xysticus spasskyi Utochkin, 1968 — Ukraine, Russia, Georgia, Azerbaijan
 Xysticus sphericus (Walckenaer, 1837) — USA
 Xysticus spiethi Gertsch, 1953 — Mexico
 Xysticus subjugalis Strand, 1906 — Ethiopia
 Xysticus subjugalis nigerrimus Caporiacco, 1941 — Ethiopia
 Xysticus tampa Gertsch, 1953 — USA
 Xysticus tarcos L. Koch, 1875 — Ethiopia
 Xysticus taukumkurt Marusik & Logunov, 1990 — Kazakhstan
 Xysticus tenuiapicalis Demir, 2012 — Turkey
 Xysticus texanus Banks, 1904 — USA, Mexico
 Xysticus thessalicoides Wunderlich, 1995 — Greece, Crete, Turkey
 Xysticus thessalicus Simon, 1916 — Balkans, Greece, Turkey, Israel
 Xysticus tikaderi Bhandari & Gajbe, 2001 — India
 Xysticus toltecus Gertsch, 1953 — Mexico
 Xysticus torsivoides Song & Zhu, 1995 — China
 Xysticus tortuosus Simon, 1932 — Portugal to Austria, Morocco, Algeria
 Xysticus transversomaculatus Bösenberg & Strand, 1906 — Korea, Japan
 Xysticus triguttatus Keyserling, 1880 — USA, Canada
 Xysticus trizonatus Ono, 1988 — Japan
 Xysticus tsanghoensis Hu, 2001 — China
 Xysticus tugelanus Lawrence, 1942 — South Africa
 Xysticus turkmenicus Marusik & Logunov, 1995 — Central Asia
 Xysticus ukrainicus Utochkin, 1968 — Russia, Georgia
 Xysticus ulmi (Hahn, 1831) — Palearctic
 Xysticus urbensis Lawrence, 1952 — South Africa
 Xysticus urgumchak Marusik & Logunov, 1990 — Central Asia
 Xysticus variabilis Keyserling, 1880 — USA
 Xysticus verecundus Gertsch, 1934 — Mexico
 Xysticus verneaui Simon, 1883 — Canary Islands, Madeira
 Xysticus viduus Kulczyński, 1898 — Palearctic
 Xysticus viveki Gajbe, 2005 — India
 Xysticus wagneri Gertsch, 1953 — Mexico
 Xysticus walesianus Karsch, 1878 — New South Wales
 Xysticus winnipegensis Turnbull, Dondale & Redner, 1965 — Canada
 Xysticus wunderlichi Logunov, Marusik & Trilikauskas, 2001 — Russia, China
 Xysticus xerodermus Strand, 1913 — Turkey, Israel
 Xysticus xiningensis Hu, 2001 — China
 Xysticus yebongensis Lee & Kim, 2018 — Korea
 Xysticus yogeshi Gajbe, 2005 — India

Gallery

References

 Norman I. Platnick - Thomisidae
 J. H. Redner and C. D. Dondale - A New Species of The Spider Genus Xysticus (Araneae: Thomisidae) From Arizona - PsycheVolume 72 (1965), Issue 4, Pages 291–294
 H. Demir, O. Seyyar, and M. Aktaş -  A Poorly Known Species of the Spider Genus Xysticus C. L. Koch (Araneae, Thomisidae) in Turkey - Arch. Biol. Sci., Belgrade, 60 (4), 17P-18P, 2008

External links

 Pictures of Xysticus triguttatus (free for noncommercial use)
 Xysticus BugGuide
 Greennature

Thomisidae
Araneomorphae genera
Cosmopolitan spiders